The name Nirgal can mean:
Nergal, a god of war in the old Babylonian religion
A character in the Mars trilogy by Kim Stanley Robinson
Nirgal Vallis, a placename on Mars